French Brazilians refers to Brazilian citizens of full of partial French ancestry or persons born in France who reside in Brazil. Between 1850 and 1965 around 100,000 French people immigrated to Brazil. The country received the second largest number of French immigrants to South America after Argentina (239,000). It is estimated that there are around 1 million Brazilians of French descent today.

French immigration to Brazil
From 1819 to 1940, 40,383 French people immigrated to Brazil. Most of them settled in the country between 1884 and 1925 (8,008 from 1819 to 1883, 25,727 from 1884 to 1925, 6,648 from 1926 to 1940). Another source estimates that around 100,000 French people immigrated to Brazil between 1850 and 1965.

The French community in Brazil numbered 592 in 1888 and 5,000 in 1915. It was estimated that 14,000 French people were living in Brazil in 1912, 9% of the 149,400 French people living in Latin America, the second largest community after Argentina (100,000).

As of 2014, it is estimated that 30,000 French people are living in Brazil, most of them in São Paulo and Rio de Janeiro. They form the largest community of French expatriates in Latin America.

French colonies

Piracicaba (São Paulo - 1852) 
Guaraqueçaba (Paraná - 1852)
Ivaí (Paraná - 1847)

Education
Brazil has the following French international schools:
 Lycée Pasteur de São Paulo
 Lycée Molière de Rio de Janeiro
 Lycée Français François Mitterrand - Brasília

Notable French Brazilians

Renée Le Brun de Vielmond
Alfred Agache, architect
Vitor Belfort
Cândido Rondon
Virginie Boutaud
Lúcio Costa
Louis Adolphe le Doulcet
Marie Durocher
Marc Ferrez
Hércules Florence
Prince Gaston, Count of Eu
Magda Tagliaferro
Paulo Autran
Aurélien Hérisson
Éder Jofre
Henriette Morineau
Pardal Mallet
Nelson Piquet
Nelson Piquet Jr.
Ivo Pitanguy
Hermano da Silva Ramos
Alberto Santos-Dumont
Arkan Simaan
Eduardo Matarazzo Suplicy
Alfredo d'Escragnolle Taunay
Félix Taunay
Paulino Soares de Sousa, 1st Viscount of Uruguai
Ricardo Boechat
Érick Jacquin

See also
 Brazil–France relations
 Brazilians in French Guiana
 Immigration to Brazil
 White Brazilians
 Huguenots in South Africa
 French Canadians
 French people

References

 
European Brazilian
Brazilian
Brazil